An emergency communications network is designed to provide reliable communications during an emergency.

The term may refer to a military network, such as:
 Ground Wave Emergency Network
 Minimum Essential Emergency Communications Network

Emergency communication networks may also be used for notifying the public of emergencies requiring action.
 NOAA Weather Radio
 Emergency Alert System
 Emergency Public Warning System 
 National Severe Weather Warning Service 

It also may refer to a network established by civil authorities, with or without volunteer help:
 Emergency communications center
 Amateur radio emergency communications
 Emergency communication system

Frequently, a previously established Emergency communications center provides dispatching of Emergency services and Emergency operations center capabilities during a severe disaster.  In the United States, dialing 911 is the most frequent method of contacting the dispatch personnel.

Emergency management